Fighter is the fourth studio album by American country music artist David Nail. It was released on July 15, 2016, via MCA Nashville. It includes the singles "Night's on Fire" and "Good at Tonight", a duet with Brothers Osborne.

Track listing

Reception
The album debuted on Billboard 200 at No. 26 on its release, as well as No. 3 on the Top Country Albums, selling 12,200 copies in its first week.  It has sold 20,100 copies in the US as of September 2016.

Personnel

 Roy Agee – trombone
 Logan Brill – background vocals on "Champagne Promise"
 Sarah Buxton – background vocals
 Chris Carmichael – string arrangements, strings
 Chris Coleman – bass guitar, drums, electric guitar, keyboards, percussion, trumpet, background vocals, Wurlitzer
 Paul Franklin – steel guitar
 Vince Gill – background vocals on "I Won't Let You Go"
 Mike Haynes – trumpet
 Sam Levine – saxophone
 Todd Lombardo – acoustic guitar, electric guitar
 Chris McHugh – drums, percussion, programming
 Lori McKenna – background vocals on "Home"
 Jerry McPherson – electric guitar
 Gene Miller – background vocals
 David Nail – lead vocals
 John Osborne – clapping and background vocals on "Good at Tonight"
 T.J. Osborne – clapping and background vocals on "Good at Tonight"
 Reed Pittman – piano
 Bear Rinehart – background vocals on "Old Man's Symphony"
 Bo Rinehart – background vocals on "Old Man's Symphony"
 Jerry Roe – bass guitar
 Mike Rojas – accordion, keyboards, piano, synthesizer
 Jonathan Singleton – acoustic guitar, background vocals
 Abe Stoklasa – background vocals
 Ilya Toshinsky – banjo, acoustic guitar, electric guitar, mandolin
 Derek Wells – acoustic guitar, electric guitar
 Bill Woodworth – oboe
 Glenn Worf – bass guitar

Chart performance

Album

Singles

References

2016 albums
David Nail albums
MCA Records albums
Albums produced by Frank Liddell